Conversations on the Plurality of Worlds is a popular science book by French author Bernard le Bovier de Fontenelle, published in 1686.

Content
The work consists of six lessons popularizing the knowledge of René Descartes and Nicolas Copernicus, given to a Marquise, spread over six evenings and preceded of a preface and a dispatch To Monsieur L*** .

 First evening. That the Earth is a Planet which turns on itself, & around the Sun.
 Second evening. That the Moon is an inhabited Earth.
 Third night. Peculiarities of the Moon World. That the other Planets are also inhabited.
 Fourth evening. Peculiarities of the Worlds of Venus, Mercury, Mars, Jupiter, & Saturn .
 Fifth night. That the Fixed Stars are so many Suns, each of which illuminates a World.
 Sixth evening.  New thoughts that confirm those of previous Interviews. Latest discoveries that have been made in Heaven.

Analysis 
Unlike many scientific works of its time, Conversations on the Plurality of Worlds was not written in Latin but in French, making it one of the first books to attempt an explanation of scientific theories in a popular language. A precursor to it could be seen in Giordano Bruno's 1584 book .

It is an early exposition of cosmic pluralism, the idea that the stars are distant suns which might have their own planetary systems, including the possibility of extraterrestrial life.

In the preface, Fontenelle suggests that the offered explanation should be easily understood even by those without scientific knowledge, and he  specifically addresses female readers.
The book itself is presented as a series of conversations between a gallant philosopher and a marquise, who walk in the latter's garden at night and gaze at stars. The philosopher explains the heliocentric model and also muses on the possibility of extraterrestrial life.

It is the first work introducing the trope that sentient Venusians are gentle, ethereal, and beautiful.

Reception
The book was very well received both in France and elsewhere, and was regularly published. In 1691, Fontenelle was elected to the Académie française.
Fontenelle's work was not cast polemically against the world view of the Catholic Church or the Protestant churches, nor did it attract the attention, positive or negative, of theologians or prelates.

The book is Fontenelle's most famous work and is considered to be one of the first major works of the Age of Enlightenment.

Translations
The first English translation was published in Dublin by Sir William Donville or Domville in 1687, followed by another translation by Aphra Behn in 1688, under the title A Discovery of New Worlds and a third by John Glanvill later in 1688. Antiokh Kantemir translated it into Russian in 1730, although the translation was only published in a censored edition in 1740, due to objections from the Russian Orthodox Church. Elizabeth Gunning translated it into English in 1803.

See also 

 Venus in fiction

References

External links
Full text of 1800 edition at Google Books (in French)
Full text of 1803 edition at Google Books (in English)
Full text of 1803 edition Digitized by Google, Free Download at OpenLibrary (in English)
 

1686 books
French books
Age of Enlightenment
Popular science books
Historical physics publications
Venus in culture